Delta Municipal Airport  is three miles (6 km) northeast of Delta, in Millard County, Utah. The National Plan of Integrated Airport Systems for 2011–2015 categorized it as a general aviation airport.

The airport opened in June 1943. The airport's runways were last resurfaced around 1989, and due to a lack of funding were risking shutdown by 1999, but as of 2009 the airport is open.

Facilities
Delta Municipal Airport covers 896 acres (363 ha) at an elevation of 4,759 feet (1,451 m). Its single runway, 17/35, is 5,500 by 75 feet (1,676 x 23 m).

In 2010 the airport had 2,156 aircraft operations, average 179 per month: 98% general aviation and 2% air taxi. Ten aircraft were then based at this airport, all single-engine.

References

External links 

 Aerial image as of June 1993 from USGS The National Map
 
 

Airports in Utah
Buildings and structures in Millard County, Utah
Transportation in Millard County, Utah